Jonathan Gradit (born 24 November 1992) is a French professional footballer who plays as a centre-back for Ligue 1 club Lens.

Career
Gradit made his Ligue 2 debut on 10 March 2014 with Tours against Angers in a 2–0 home win.

On 20 August 2019, he signed a two-year contract with Ligue 2 club RC Lens for an estimated amount of 400,000€. The contract was set to automatically be extended for one year in case Lens got promoted.

On 5 February 2023, he scored his first goal ever in Ligue 1 against Brest.

References

1992 births
Living people
People from Talence
Sportspeople from Gironde
French footballers
Footballers from Nouvelle-Aquitaine
Association football defenders
Ligue 1 players
Ligue 2 players
Championnat National 2 players
Championnat National 3 players
FC Girondins de Bordeaux players
Aviron Bayonnais FC players
Stade Malherbe Caen players
Tours FC players
RC Lens players